Urmiyazy (Urmiyaź) is a rural locality (a selo) and the administrative center of Urmiyazovsky Selsoviet, Askinsky District, Bashkortostan, Russia. The population was 583 as of 2010. There are 6 streets.

Geography 
Urmiyazy is located 24 km east of Askino (the district's administrative centre) by road. Novokochkildino is the nearest rural locality.

References 

Rural localities in Askinsky District
Ufa Governorate